Opika von Méray Horváth (December 30, 1889 – April 25, 1977), a.k.a. Zsófia Méray-Horváth, was a Hungarian figure skater. She won three consecutive World titles (1912–1914).

Biography
Méray Horváth was born in Arad in 1889. She began skating in Budapest Skating Club (Budapesti Korcsolyázó Egylet). She is the second top level female Hungarian skater, after Lily Kronberger.

In World Figure Skating Championships in Vienna in 1911, Méray Horváth placed second behind Kronberger; in the next three years, she won consecutive gold medals. World War I ended her career.

She later worked as a language teacher and died in Budapest in 1977.

Results

External links 
 Magyar Életrajzi Lexikon
 Skating in Hungary 2004 European Figure Skating Championships

1889 births
1977 deaths
Sportspeople from Arad, Romania
Hungarian nobility
Hungarian female single skaters
World Figure Skating Championships medalists